James Woodburn-Hall (born 2 February 1995) is a Jamaica international rugby league footballer who plays as a  or  for the Halifax Panthers in the Betfred Championship.

Background
Woodburn-Hall was born in Isleworth, London, England.

Career
Woodburn-Hall has previously played for the London Broncos in the Super League, spent time on loan at the London Skolars and played for the Skolars and Hemel Stags in Championship One.

References

External links
Halifax profile
Scoresway profile
Jamaica profile

1995 births
Living people
English people of Jamaican descent
English rugby league players
Halifax R.L.F.C. players
Hemel Stags players
Jamaica national rugby league team players
Jamaican rugby league players
London Broncos players
London Skolars players
People from Isleworth
Rugby league centres
Rugby league five-eighths
Rugby league halfbacks
Rugby league players from Greater London